Ala is a rural locality (a selo) in Tlogobsky Selsoviet, Gunibsky District, Republic of Dagestan, Russia. The population was 140 as of 2010.

Geography 
Ala is located 43 km northwest of Gunib (the district's administrative centre) by road, on the Kudiyabor River. Lakhchayda and Agada are the nearest rural localities.

References 

Rural localities in Gunibsky District